Thermales is an order of bacteria belonging to the Deinococcota phylum. They are particularly resistant to heat, and live in the benthic zone of the Gulf of Mexico.

Members of the order Thermales can be distinguished from all other bacteria through molecular signatures consisting of conserved signature indels (CSIs) and conserved signature proteins (CSPs) that are exclusively present in members of this order. Specifically, six CSIs were identified in the following proteins: DNA topoisomerase I, ABC transporter permease, citrate synthase, phosphoribosylformylglycinamidine synthase, pyruvate dehydrogenase and alpha-glucan phosphorylase. 51 CSPs were also found to be exclusively shared by members of this order.

In addition, a 76 aa CSI is present in the protein SecA preprotein translocase which is specific to all members of the order Thermales as well as Hydrogenibacillus schlegelii (also an thermophilic species). Based on studies on other CSIs and CSPs, it is likely that some of these CSIs and CSPs could have implications in the thermophilic phenotype of Thermales species.

Phylogeny

See also
 List of bacteria genera
 List of bacterial orders

References

Deinococcota